The My Step Alliance (IKD) was a political alliance in Armenia formed by the Civil Contract party, the Mission Party and various independent representatives of civil society. It was formed in August 2018, before the 2018 Yerevan City Council election. The leader of the alliance was the Prime Minister of Armenia Nikol Pashinyan. Despite its dissolution as a national party, the My Step Alliance still operates in the Yerevan City Council.

History 

On 31 March, at the beginning of the 2018 Armenian revolution, Nikol Pashinyan and a group of supporters began a march from Gyumri, Armenia's second largest city. The campaign, named "My Step", was declared with the intention to prevent Serzh Sargsyan's election as prime minister on 17 April.

On 23 September 2018, the alliance participated in the 2018 Yerevan City Council election with Hayk Marutyan as a candidate for Mayor and won 57 seats out of 65 in the Yerevan City Council.

The alliance ran in the 2018 Armenian parliamentary election. They won 88 of 132 seats, gaining a ruling majority in the National Assembly.

The alliance dissolved in May 2021, following an announcement that Civil Contract would participate in the 2021 Armenian parliamentary elections independently.

Ideology 
The coalition was perceived as maintaining a big tent ideology rather than supporting any one particular political position. The coalition's main focus was on anti-corruption efforts while developing Armenia's civil society and democracy and promoting the economic development of the country. However, Nikol Pashinyan has been described as a centrist politician with a liberal outlook. In terms of foreign policy, before coming to power, Pashinyan was a skeptic of Russia. However, following his victory, Pashinyan changed his official opinion and opted to maintain strong relations between Armenia and Russia. Despite this, Pashinyan also supported the development of bilateral relations with the European Union and the United States.

Composition 
The alliance was composed of the following parties, as well as some independents.

Electoral record

Parliamentary elections

Local elections

Yerevan City Council elections

See also

 Politics of Armenia
 Programs of political parties in Armenia

References 

2018 establishments in Armenia
Centrist parties in Europe
Political parties established in 2018
Neoliberal parties
Defunct political party alliances in Armenia
Liberal parties in Armenia